T. Radhakrishnan (2 June 1955 – 11 December 2022) was an Indian politician and Member of Parliament elected from Tamil Nadu. He was elected to the Lok Sabha from Virudhunagar constituency as an Anna Dravida Munnetra Kazhagam candidate in 2014 election.

Radhakrishnan was a Virudhunagar district secretary and three-time chairman of Sivakasi panchayat union. His party did not give seat to him.to contest 2019 Indian general election. It gave the seat to alliance party DMDK's R. Alagarsamy to contest the election but he lost to Manicka Tagore of the INC.

Radhakrishnan died on 11 December 2022, at the age of 67.

References 

1955 births
2022 deaths
All India Anna Dravida Munnetra Kazhagam politicians
India MPs 2014–2019
Lok Sabha members from Tamil Nadu
People from Virudhunagar district